In enzymology, a pyridoxal oxidase is an enzyme that catalyzes the chemical reaction

pyridoxal + H2O + O2  4-pyridoxate + (?)

The 3 substrates of this enzyme are pyridoxal, H2O, and O2, whereas its product is 4-pyridoxate.

This enzyme belongs to the family of oxidoreductases, specifically those acting on the aldehyde or oxo group of donor with oxygen as acceptor.  The systematic name of this enzyme class is pyridoxal:oxygen 4-oxidoreductase. This enzyme participates in vitamin B6 metabolism.  It employs one cofactor, molybdenum.

References

 
 

EC 1.2.3
Molybdenum enzymes
Enzymes of unknown structure